Anydraula is a genus of moths of the family Crambidae.

Species
 Anydraula glycerialis (Walker, 1859)
 Anydraula pericompsa (Turner, 1915)

References

Acentropinae
Crambidae genera
Taxa named by Edward Meyrick